Timothy William Vollmer (born September 13, 1946) is a retired American athlete who mainly competed in the discus throw. In 1971 he won the AAU title and a silver medal at the Pan American Games. He placed in the top four at the AAU Championships in 1968–73 and finished eighth at the 1972 Summer Olympics. Vollmer is a member of the Portland Interscholastic League Sports Hall of Fame.

References

1946 births
Living people
American male discus throwers
Olympic track and field athletes of the United States
Athletes (track and field) at the 1972 Summer Olympics
Track and field athletes from Portland, Oregon
Pan American Games medalists in athletics (track and field)
Pan American Games silver medalists for the United States
Athletes (track and field) at the 1971 Pan American Games
Medalists at the 1971 Pan American Games